Pluteus cyanopus is a species of agaric fungus in the family Pluteaceae. Found in Africa, Europe, and North America, its fruit bodies contain the psychoactive compounds psilocybin and psilocin. The species was first described scientifically by French mycologist Lucien Quélet in 1883.

See also
List of Pluteus species
List of Psilocybin mushrooms

References

External links

Fungi described in 1883
Fungi of Africa
Fungi of Europe
Fungi of North America
cyanopus
Psychoactive fungi
Psychedelic tryptamine carriers